Balarang is a suburb of Wollongong, New South Wales, Australia, located on the southern shore of Lake Illawarra. It is officially designated an urban place, and forms the eastern end of the suburb of Oak Flats.

The name is said to mean "place of swamp oak".

See also
 Oak Flats

References

Suburbs of Wollongong
City of Shellharbour